Sasura Bada Paisawala is a 2003 Indian Bhojpuri-language romance-drama film directed by Ajay Sinha, starring Manoj Tiwari and  Rani Chatterjee. The film, released in 2003, cost about 30 lakhs to make, and was the highest grossing Bhojpuri film at that time.

, the film is still the highest-grossing Bhojpuri film of history.

Plot 
A boy meets a girl, and they fall in love, they decide to marry against opposition, leading to fighting and reconciliation.

Cast 

 Manoj Tiwari as Raja
 Rani Chatterjee as Rani
 Balkar Singh Bali as Chhedi

Soundtrack 
The soundtrack of the movie is directed by Lal Sinha. This was the first movie of Sinha. Lal Sinha, from Gaya, Bihar, came to Mumbai in 2001 and started struggling as music director. Sinha had a very good relation with singer Shreya Ghoshal. When Sinha got the film, he requested Ghoshal to sing in his film. In the beginning, Shreya was not ready to sing Bhojpuri songs. But when she heard the compositions of music director Sinha, she immediately agreed to sing for Sinha. And this became the first Bhojpuri film of Ghoshal. The lyrics were penned by Vinay Bihari, and is labelled by T-Series.

Box office 
According to some reports, this film got screens for four to five months continuously, and all are houseful.

Sequel
A sequel of film, named "Sasura Bada Paisawala 2", was released on 21 February 2020.

References 

2003 films
2000s Bhojpuri-language films
Films released on YouTube